The Selk'nam, also known as the Onawo or Ona people, are an indigenous people in the Patagonian region of southern Argentina and Chile, including the Tierra del Fuego islands. They were one of the last native groups in South America to be encountered by migrant Europeans in the late 19th century. In the mid-19th century, there were about 4000 Selk'nam; by 1919 there were 297, and by 1930 just over 100.

They are considered extinct as a tribe. The exploration of gold and the introduction of farming in the region of Tierra del Fuego led to genocide of the Selk'nam. Joubert Yantén Gómez, a Chilean mestizo of part Selk'nam ancestry, has taught himself the language and is considered the only speaker; he uses the name Keyuk.

While the Selk'nam are closely associated with living in the northeastern area of Tierra del Fuego, they are believed to have originated as a people on the mainland. Thousands of years ago, they migrated by canoe across the Strait of Magellan. Their territory in the early Holocene probably ranged as far as the Cerro Benítez area of the Cerro Toro mountain range in Chile.

Lifestyle 

Traditionally, the Selk'nam were nomadic people who relied on hunting for survival. They dressed sparingly despite the cold climate of Patagonia. They shared Tierra del Fuego with the Haush (or Manek'enk), another nomadic culture who lived in the south-eastern part of the island. Also in the region were the Yámana or Yahgan.

Relations with Europeans 

In Late 1599 a small Dutch fleet led by Olivier van Noort entered the Strait of Magellan and had a hostile encounter with Selk'nam which left about forty Selk'nam dead. It was the bloodiest recorded event in the strait until then.

The Selk'nam had little contact with ethnic Europeans until settlers arrived in the late 19th century. These newcomers developed a great part of the land of Tierra del Fuego as large estancias (ranches), depriving the natives of their ancestral hunting areas. Selk'nam, who considered the sheep herds to be game rather than private property (which they did not have as a concept) hunted the sheep. The ranch owners considered this to be poaching, and paid armed groups or militia to hunt down and kill the Selk'nam, in what is now called the Selk'nam Genocide. To receive their bounty, such groups had to bring back the ears of victims.

Salesian missionaries worked to protect and preserve Selk'nam culture. Father José María Beauvoir  explored the region and studied the native Patagonian cultures and languages between 1881 and 1924. He compiled a 4000 word vocabulary of the Selk'nam language, and 1400 phrases and sentences, which was published in 1915. He included a comparative list of 150 Ona-Tehuelche words, as he believed that there were connections to the Tehuelche people and language to the north. German anthropologist Robert Lehmann-Nitsche published the first scholarly studies of the Selk'nam, although he was later criticized for having studied members of the Selk'nam people who had been abducted and were exhibited in circuses.

Relations with Europeans in the Beagle Channel area in the southern area of the island of Tierra del Fuego were somewhat more cordial than with the ranchers. Thomas Bridges, who had been an Anglican missionary at Ushuaia, retired from that service. He was given a large land grant by the Argentine government, where he founded Estancia Harberton. Lucas Bridges, one of his three sons, did much to help the local cultures. Like his father, he learned the languages of the various groups and tried to provide the natives with some space in which to live their customary lives as "lords of their own land". The forces of change were against them, and the indigenous people continued to have high fatality rates as their cultures were disrupted. Lucas Bridges' book, Uttermost Part of the Earth (1948), provides sympathetic insight into the lives of the Selk'nam and Yahgan.

Demise 

Two Christian missions were established to preach to the Selk'nam. They were intended to provide housing and food for the natives, but closed due to the small number of Selk'nam remaining; they had numbered in the thousands before Western colonization, but by the early twentieth century only a few hundred remained. The last ethnic Selk'nam died in the mid-twentieth century.

Alejandro Cañas estimated that in 1896 there was a population of 3,000 Selk'nam. Martín Gusinde, an Austrian priest and ethnologist who studied them in the early 20th century, wrote in 1919 that only 279 Selk'nam remained. In 1945 the Salesian missionary, Lorenzo Massa, counted 25. In May 1974 Ángela Loij, the last full-blood Selk'nam, died. There are probably surviving descendants of partial Selk'nam ancestry. According to the Argentine census of 2001, there were 391 Selk'nam (Ona) living in the island of Tierra del Fuego, and an additional 114 in other parts of Argentina.

Culture and religion 
The missions and early 20th-century anthropologists collected information about Selk'nam religion and traditions while trying to help them preserve their culture. Missionary José Beauvoir  compiled a dictionary of the Selk'nam language.

Language

The Selk'nam spoke a Chon language. The last native speaker died in 1974 but Joubert Yanten Gomez, a linguistic prodigy from Santiago, Chile, taught himself the language in the early 21st century while still a teenager. He calls himself by a Selk'nam name, Keyuk. He studied the lexicon published in 1915 by Beauvoir, studied recordings of the language made by anthropologist Anne Chapman forty years earlier, in order to learn its sound. He speaks several other indigenous languages and is learning Yagan.

Religion

Selk'nam religion was a complex system of beliefs. It described spirit beings as a part of the past, in creation myth. Temáukel was the name of the great supernatural entity who they believed kept the world order. The creator deity of the world was called Kénos or Quénos.

Many of their tales recounted shaman-like characters. Such a  has supernatural capabilities, e.g. he can control weather.

Initiation ceremonies
Selk'nam male initiation ceremonies, the passage to adulthood, was called Hain. Nearby indigenous peoples, the Yahgan and Haush, had similar initiation ceremonies.

Young males were called to a dark hut. There they would be attacked by "spirits", who were people dressed as supernatural beings. The children were taught to believe in and fear these spirits at childhood and were threatened by them in case they misbehaved. Their task in this rite of passage was to unmask the spirits; when the boys saw that the spirits were human, they were told a story of world creation related to the sun and moon. In a related story, they were told that in the past women used to be disguised as spirits to control men. When the men discovered the masquerade, they, in turn, would threaten women as spirits. According to the men, the women never learned that the masked males were not truly spirits, but the males found out at the initiation rite.

The contemporary ceremonies used this interplay in somewhat of a joking way. After the first day, related ceremonies and rituals took place. Males showed their "strength" in front of women by fighting spirits (who were other males but the women supposedly did not know it) in some theatrical fights. Each spirit was played with traditional actions, words and gestures, so that everyone could identify it. The best spirit actors from previous Hains were called again to impersonate spirits in later Hains.

Apart from these dramatic re-enactments of mythic events, the Hain involved tests for young males for courage, resourcefulness, resisting temptation, resisting pain and overcoming fear. It also included prolonged instructional courses to train the young men in the tasks for which they would be responsible.

Before European encounter, the various rites of the Hain lasted a very long time, perhaps even a year on occasion. It would end with the last fight against the "worst" spirit. Usually Hains were started when there was enough food (for example a whale was washed onto the coast), a time when all the Selk'nam from all the bands used to gather at one place, in male and female camps. "Spirits" sometimes went to female encampments to scare them, as well as moving around and acting out in ways that related to their characters.

The last Hain was held in one of the missions in the early 20th century, and was photographed by missionary Martin Gusinde. It was a shorter and smaller ceremony than they used to hold. The photos show the "spirit" costumes they created and wore. Gusinde's The Lost Tribes of Tierra Del Fuego (2015) was published in English by Thames & Hudson, and in French and Spanish by Éditions Xavier Barral.

Heritage 

Pictures of Selk'nam people taken by the missionaries are displayed at the Martin Gusinde Anthropological Museum at Puerto Williams. There are also a few books on the subject, including Selk'nam tales, collected by the missions, and a dictionary of the Selk'nam language. Due to early contact by missionaries, they collected much more information about the Selk'nam people than about other people of the region.

Austrian priest and ethnologist Gusinde tried also to collect information about other local nations, but he found their numbers much reduced. He was able to write more about traditional Selk'nam culture because it was still being lived.

The 2010 National Population Census in Argentina revealed the existence of 2,761 people who recognized themselves as Onas throughout the country, 294 of them in the province of Tierra del Fuego, Antarctica and the South Atlantic Islands (Land of Fire).

See also
 Kawésqar
 Kawésqar language

References

Further reading
 Luis Alberto Borrero, Los Selk'nam (Onas), Buenos Aires: Galerna, 2007
 Lucas Bridges, Uttermost Part of the Earth, London, 1948

External links 

 Glenn H. Shepard Jr., "Specters of a Civilization:" review of Martin Gusinde's Lost Tribes of Tierra del Fuego, New York Review of Books, 9 August 2015, review includes early 20th-century photographs of the Selk'nam by Gusinde
 Documentary about Joubert Yanten, Canadian Broadcasting Corporation, 2 July 2001
 "The young man who is reviving a dying language", BBC News, 2 August 2015
 
 About the Ona Indian Culture in Tierra Del Fuego, Victory Cruises.

 
Hunter-gatherers of South America
Indigenous peoples in Tierra del Fuego